Joy Tacon (born 2 June 1961) is a British former professional tennis player.

Tacon was born in 1961 and is a graduate of Wycombe Abbey School. She attended the University of Houston on a tennis scholarship. At the 1985 University Games in Kobe, she teamed up with Liz Jones to win a silver medal for Great Britain in doubles.

A right-handed, Tacon competed on the professional tour from 1984 to 1988, reaching a career high ranking of 180 in the world. She twice received a wildcard into the singles main draw at Wimbledon and fell in the first round to seeded players both times, Kathy Jordan in 1985 and Hana Mandlíková in 1986. Her best Wimbledon performance was a second round appearance in the women's doubles at the 1985 Wimbledon Championships losing to Martina Navratilova and Pam Shriver. However, she also reached the first round in both the 1986 and 1988 Championships for doubles as well as qualifying and getting through to the first round in the mixed doubles with Mike Walker. They lost to Steffi Graf and Pavel Složil in that, the first, round of the 1988 Wimbledon Championships

After concluding her professional tennis career, Tacon set up the tennis programme at Putney High School, where she taught A-Level Economics (1990-1994). Additionally, she also set up the Young Enterprise scheme at Putney High, where it continues today.

From 1994-2003, she worked as the managing director of Merrill Legal Solutions where, she set up the company from a base of operations in Hong Kong to provide court reporting and technology for litigation lawyers. This company was subsequently expanded throughout Asia, Australia and Hong Kong. From 2003-2007 she worked as a consultant for the aforementioned company.

Furthermore, since 1992–present she has been the managing director of a private property company and recently (2019–present) started working with Yoke, a Mental Health and Wellbeing Consultancy for the Public and Private Sector.

ITF finals

Doubles: 12 (5–7)

Personal life

Joy Tacon is sister of Christine Tacon

References

External links
 
 

1961 births
Living people
British female tennis players
English female tennis players
Universiade medalists in tennis
Universiade silver medalists for Great Britain
Houston Cougars women's tennis players
People educated at Wycombe Abbey
Medalists at the 1985 Summer Universiade